Sphaerodactylus parkeri, also known commonly as  Parker's least gecko or the southern Jamaica banded sphaero, is a small species of lizard in the family Sphaerodactylidae. The species is endemic to Jamaica.

Etymology
The specific name, parkeri, is in honor of English herpetologist Hampton Wildman Parker.

Habitat

Reproduction
S. parkeri is oviparous.

References

Further reading
Grant C (1939). "Two New Sphaerodactyls from Jamaica". Copeia 1939 (1): 7–13. (Spliacrodactylus parkeri, new species, p. 8).
Rösler H (2000). "Kommentierte Liste der rezent, subrezent und fossil bekannten Geckotaxa (Reptilia: Gekkonomorpha)". Gekkota 2: 28–153. (Sphaerodactylus parkeri, p. 113). (in German).
Schwartz A, Henderson RW (1991). Amphibians and Reptiles of the West Indies: Descriptions, Distributions, and Natural History. Gainesville, Florida: University of Florida Press. 720 pp. . (Sphaerodactylus parkeri, p. 521).
Schwartz A, Thomas R (1975). A Check-list of West Indian Amphibians and Reptiles. Carnegie Museum of Natural History Special Publication No. 1. Pittsburgh, Pennsylvania: Carnegie Museum of Natural History. 216 pp. (Sphaerodactylus parkeri, p. 159).

Sphaerodactylus
Endemic fauna of Jamaica
Reptiles of Jamaica
Reptiles described in 1939
Taxa named by Chapman Grant